The number of Indian students studying outside India rapidly increased by 163% between 1999 and 2006 to reach 145,539 as compared to slower growth of 25% between 2006 and 2013 to reach 181,872, according to an analysis of UNESCO data. As of January 2021, more than 1 million Indian students are studying in 85 countries outside India. More than 50% of Indian students study in North America.

Students from India in Canada 
As of 2019, there were over 219,000 Indian study permit holders in Canada, constituting 34% of Canada's foreign student population.

Historical trends 
The number of Indian students in Canada exceeded the number of Chinese students in Canada in 2018, with the Indian student population quadrupling between 2015 and 2019. The number of Indian students in Canada increased from 48,765 in 2015 to 219,855 in 2019.

Impact of the Covid-19 pandemic 
Canada placed a travel ban on India and Pakistan starting April 22, 2021, because of the Covid-19 pandemic. With the ban being extended further, Indian students from Punjab reportedly travelled to Canada through Moscow, Mexico, Serbia, Qatar, Dubai among other locations, paying up to three times the regular air fare. Canada also does not accept RT-PCR tests from Indian labs because of which students travelling from India are forced to get tested elsewhere before entering Canada.

University of Ottawa professor Amir Attaran slammed Canada PM Justin Trudeau's decision to ban flights from India as racist, pointing out that the United Kingdom experienced 6500% higher cases than Canada in the same time period but did not face a similar travel ban to Canada.

Student Visas and Migration 
Canada is a preferred destination for Indian nationals due to strong diasporic presence of the community and the benefits offered by the Post-Graduation Work Permit (PGWP). Policy experts suggest that Indian students intending to go to the US are instead moving to Canada because of the former's unfavorable quota-based H-1B visa program. The decisions of Australia and New Zealand to close borders to international students in 2021 also contributed to the surge in Indian student migration to Canada.

According to student reports from India, study-permit refusal rates to Canada were as high as 60% during the Fall 2021 semester. Students with poor academic records and those from less fortunate financial backgrounds were refused study permits, according to Narpat Singh Babbar, a Canadian education consultant.

Students from India in the United Arab Emirates 
Around 219,000 Indian students are living in the United Arab Emirates, as of 2021. Indian students in the UAE are heavily engaged in primary and secondary education, with more than 98,000 Indian students studying in private schools in Dubai alone. Of 30,000 students enrolled in Dubai's free-zone universities in 2019, 14% were from India.

Impact of the Covid-19 Pandemic 
From June 23, 2021, UAE eased travel restrictions with India, allowing Indian students access to Dubai's educational institutions. Dubai's Indian schools reported 50% on-campus attendance rates for pupils studying in the post-spring break session in 2021. Many students had not attended classes physically for up to a year.

Students from India in the United States of America 
211,930 Indian students were recorded in the United States as of 2022.

Economic Significance 
Indian students pumped USD 7.6 billion into the US economy during the 2019-20 period.

Historical trends 
In 2010, the number of Indian students studying in the US crossed 100,000. According to the 2017 report, the number of Indian students in the USA numbered 186,000. In 2019, Indian students opting for the US declined by 4%. At least 207,000 international Indian students were recorded to be present in the United States in 2020. As of 2022, India has surpassed China to become the top country with most international students in the United States.

Impact of the Covid-19 pandemic 
Enrolment in the 2020 Fall Semester dropped by 43% following the Covid-19 pandemic. In July 2020, the American administration announced that international university students may have to leave the United States if their studies moved completely online, putting the future of tens of thousands of students in jeopardy. First-time student visa applicants expressed their concerns about shut embassies and limited staff availability, with many postponing their study plans. In May 2021, certain categories of Indian students were exempted from US travel restrictions.

Student Visas and Migration 
The country-cap on Green Cards has been slammed as 'discriminatory' by Indian-American advocacy groups, particularly because its leaves qualified Indian professionals in the US waiting for decades to obtain permanent residency. Permanent residency is an important factor for many Indian students, and this is reflected in comparative admission rate trends in the US and Canada. US lawmakers have expressed their disapproval of the US immigration system that has driven international students, particularly those from India, north to Canada.

Students from India in the UK 
There are 139,539 Indian nationals on study visas in the UK, as of 2022.

Historical trends 
The number of Indians granted study visas grew by 307% between 2019 and 2022, increasing from 34,261 to 139,539. India also displaced China as the most common nationality granted UK study visas, with the East Asian country recording 102,842 such nationals in 2022. Together, Indian and Chinese nationals comprise half of all study visa grants in the UK.

Students from India in Australia 
As of July 2022, there are 96,000 Indian students in Australia.

Historical trends 
After peaking in 2009, the number of Indian students studying in Australia fell following violent attacks against Indians in Australia. By 2015, the number had risen to exceed the 2009 number. During 2013-14, 34,100 Australian visas were issued to Indian students, a rise of 38% as compared to the previous period. There were 115,000 Indian students present in Australia in 2020, and 77,000 Indian students present in Australia in 2021. According to data furnished in India's Rajya Sabha in 2021, the number of Indian students registered in Australia was as high as 92,383. In the second half of 2022, India overtook China as the number one country lodging student visa applications in Australia.

Impact of the Covid-19 pandemic 
Due to border closure starting the second half of 2020, the number of new Indian students studying in Australia declined by 83% At least 12,740 Indian nationals holding Australian student visas were stuck outside Australia as of January 2021. In March 2021, Indian students and other temporary visa holders staged protests in Delhi and Chandigarh, objecting to Australia's uncompromising approach that kept them out of the country for a year despite the Covid-19 cases in India being relatively low at the time. Unhappy with the country's lack of support to international students, enrolled students took to social media to warn others against studying in Australia. Some Indian students made the switch to Canada owing to its friendlier approach towards international students.

Student Visas and Migration 
There have been calls for fast-tracking permanent residency for onshore Australian residents from India, with stress on creating smoother pathways to migration for international students.

Students from India in Saudi Arabia 
As of 2021, there are 80,800 Indian students in Saudi Arabia.

Historical Trends 
70,800 Indian students were present in Saudi Arabia as of 2018.

Students from India in Oman 
At least 43,600 Indian students are enrolled in institutions in Oman. 7,000 of these students belong to the Tamil community alone.

Impact of the Covid-19 pandemic 
3,000 Indian students obtained transfer certificates as their families prepared to leave Oman during the pandemic.

Students from India in Germany 
There are 33,753 Indian students present in Germany, as of 2022.

Historical Trends 
During the 2014-15 period, Indian students studying in Germany constituted 4.9% of international students in the country. By 2019, the number of Indian students in Germany increased to 25,149.

Students from India in New Zealand 
There were 29,000 Indian students enrolled in New Zealand, as of 2015.

Student Visas and Migration 
A 26% student visa refusal rate was reported for Indian students applying to study in New Zealand between July 2019 and February 2020.

Students from India in China
Around 23,000 Indian students were enrolled in Chinese higher education institutions as of 2019, with a majority of them studying medicine.

Impact of the Covid-19 pandemic 
In February 2020, India evacuated more than 600 of its students from Wuhan. Many Indian students have been stuck outside China following travel restrictions placed during the Covid-19 Pandemic.

Students from India in Russia 
As of 2021, at least 16,500 Indian students are registered in Russian institutions. Of these, 6,000 students are pursuing research and higher studies.

Students from India in the Philippines 
Around 15,000 Indian students are present in the Philippines. Between 2,500 and 3,200 Indian students are studying medicine in the Philippines. Low tuition costs and the abundance of English speakers in the country drive attraction to the country. Agents are known to have extorted money from unsuspecting students travelling to the Philippines in hopes to further their education.

Students from India in Bahrain 
As of 2017, there are more than 10,000 Indian students in Bahrain.

Students from India in Kyrgyzstan
As of 2020, more than 10,000 Indian students are studying in Kyrgyzstan.

Impact of the Covid-19 pandemic 
16,000 Indian students found themselves stranded in Kyrgyzstan during the Covid-19 pandemic. At least 145 were flown back by Air India to Delhi and various cities of India.

Students from India in France
As of 2019, there were 10,000 Indian students in France. The country aims to attract 20,000 Indian students by 2025.

Impact of the Covid-19 pandemic 
In July 2021, France announced that fully vaccinated Indian students, among other Indian nationals, can travel to France without restriction.

Students from India in Bangladesh
An estimated 7,000 to 8,000 Indian students, mostly from Jammu and Kashmir, are enrolled in medical institutions in Bangladesh.

Impact of the Covid-19 pandemic 
In March 2020, at least 64 students unsuccessfully attempted to cross the Bangladesh-India border from Bangladesh to India in a bus. As of May 2021, scores of Indian students are unable to return to their colleges in Bangladesh due to travel restrictions in place during the Covid-19 pandemic.

Students from India in Italy 
As of 2021, almost 5,000 Indian students were present in Italy.

Historical Trends 
In 2020, there were 1,500 Indian students in Italy.

Impact of the Covid-19 pandemic 
Following the Covid-19 pandemic, a travel ban prevented Indian students from travelling to Italy.

Students from India in Spain 
Approximately 4,500 students from India moved to Spain for education in 2019.

Students from India in Singapore
As of 2012, there were 3,000 Indian students in Singapore.

Students from India in the Netherlands
At least 3,000 students went to the Netherlands in 2019 for higher studies. Higher quality of education, availability of English-based courses, and access to the European Union, are the key drivers of growth in Indian student arrivals to the Netherlands.

Students from India in Latvia 
As of 2020, around 3,000 Indians study in Latvia, constituting almost one-third of all foreign students in the country.

Students from India in Poland 
2,449 Indian students were recorded in Poland as of 2022, second only to Turkish students, numbered at 2,854.

Students from India in Iran
There are 1,700 Indian students in Iran, as revealed by India's Rajya Sabha.

Impact of the Covid-19 pandemic 
At least 300 Indian students in Iran were stranded due to the Covid-19 pandemic.

Students from India in Tajikistan
Nearly 1,300 Indian students were recorded in Tajikistan.

Impact of the Covid-19 pandemic 
All 1,300 students were stranded in Tajikistan during the Covid-19 pandemic and sought help from the Indian government to return home.

Students from India in Japan
As of May 2016, there were 1,015 Indian students in Japan, according to The Japan Research Institute. In comparison, Japanese universities attract 10,000 Chinese enrollees every year.

Students from India in Switzerland
There are about 1,000 Indian students present in Switzerland.

Students from India in Ukraine
At least 20,000 Indian students were studying in various medical colleges in Ukraine in 2021.

Impact of the Russia-Ukraine War 
As of March 2022, 18,000 Indians living in Ukraine, mostly students, were evacuated from Romania, Poland, Hungary, Slovakia and Moldova as part of Operation Ganga. One Indian student was killed by shelling in Kharkiv.

Students from India in other countries

 Hong Kong - 916 Indian students as of 2022.
 Belarus - 906 Indian students as of 2022.
 Israel - 900 Indian students as of 2022.
 Belgium - 764 Indian students as of 2022.
 Czech Republic - 658 Indian students as of 2022.
 Kazakhstan - 4000+ Indian students as of 2023.
Portugal - 415 Indian students as of 2022.
Denmark - 369 Indian students as of 2022.
Lithuania - 357 Indian students as of 2014.
Bulgaria - 357 Indian students as of 2022.
Egypt - 356 Indian students as of 2022.
Austria - 350 Indian students as of 2022.
Thailand - 297 Indian students as of 2022.
Pakistan - 230 Indian students as of 2021.
Guyana - 184 Indian students as of 2022.
Barbados - 86 Indian students as of 2022.
Luxembourg - 80 Indian students as of 2022.
Azerbaijan - 58 Indian students as of 2018.
Brazil - 4 Indian students as of 2022.
Uzbekistan - 2 Indian students as of 2017.
Greece - 2 Indian students as of 2017.
Bosnia - 2 Indian students as of 2017.
Vietnam - 1 Indian student as of 2022.
Serbia - 1 Indian student as of 2017.
Mongolia - 1 Indian student as of 2017.

See also
 Immigration law
 International student
 Indian Diaspora
H-1B visa
Immigration to Canada
Immigration to the United States
Immigration to Australia
Immigration to New Zealand
Immigration to Germany
Immigration to Russia
Immigration to the United Kingdom
Immigration to Japan

References 

International education industry
Indian diaspora
Students in India